Michael Matteson was an anti-war activist who resisted conscription into the Australian Army during the Vietnam War, due to his anarchist philosophy and principles.

In 1972, Matteson was being escorted by two Commonwealth policemen—handcuffed to one at each wrist—as he had previously taken part in highly public escapes.  As the police escorted him through Sydney University, thousands of university students nonviolently confronted and blockaded the officers' movement.  The combined action of the students pressured the officers into freeing Matteson.  The event became known as the "Michael Matteson Handcuff Incident".

In late November 1972 Matteson was jailed but within weeks, along with six other draft resisters, he was freed on direction of newly elected Prime Minister Gough Whitlam.

References

External links
Notes by Michael Matteson on Australian draft resistance

Australian anarchists
Australian conscientious objectors
People from Sydney
Year of birth missing (living people)
Living people
Cold War history of Australia